Penny Smith (born 21 April 1995) is an Australian sports shooter. 

Smith competed in the women's trap event and also the team event with Thomas Grice at the 2020 Summer Olympics. She did not score sufficient points in either event to advance past qualification.

References

External links
 

1995 births
Living people
Australian female sport shooters
Olympic shooters of Australia
Shooters at the 2020 Summer Olympics
Sportspeople from Geelong
Sportswomen from Victoria (Australia)
20th-century Australian women
21st-century Australian women